Baseball was contested at the 1993 Summer Universiade in Buffalo, United States. The tournament was only for men.

Medal summary

Final standing

External links
Results

1993
1993 Summer Universiade
1993 in baseball